Yinyuan is a town in Yuanjiang Hani, Yi and Dai Autonomous County, Yunnan, China.

Administrative division
As of 2016, the town is divided into two communities and seven villages: 
 Yinyuan Community
 Anding Community
 Beize
 Chezhi
 Kala
 Bankun
 Dukui
 Pugui
 Lutong

Geography
It lies at the southwestern of Yuanjiang Hani, Yi and Dai Autonomous County, bordering Mojiang Hani Autonomous County to the west, Honghe County to the south, Mili Township to the north, and Yangjie Township to the east.

The Wulong Reservoir is a reservoir located in the town.

Economy
The town's economy is based on nearby mineral resources and agricultural resources. Commercial crops include tobacco, tea, and rape. The region also has an abundance of gold, silver, nickel, iron, asbestos, and serpentine.
The nickel reserves in the town rank second in China.

Transportation
The National Highway G213 winds through the town.

References

Bibliography

Divisions of Yuanjiang Hani, Yi and Dai Autonomous County